Girls is the debut studio album by American rapper Yung Baby Tate (later known as Baby Tate). It was self-released on February 5, 2019. The album was preceded by the singles "Pretty Girl" and "That Girl". On June 25, 2019, a deluxe version was released with four bonus tracks.

Release and promotion
On April 3, 2018, Tate released "Pretty Girl", the lead single from the album. The song was re-released as a remix featuring Killumantii and Mulatto on January 16, 2019. On November 13, 2018, Tate released "That Girl" as the second single from the album. Girls, along with its tracklist and release date, was officially announced by Tate via Twitter on January 22, 2019.

A short film was released on January 29, 2019 to accompany the album and was directed by Christian Cody, who also shot the album cover. The deluxe edition of Girls was teased by Tate on her social medias in May and June 2019. The release date and cover were officially revealed by Tate via Twitter on June 18, 2019.

Critical reception

Girls received a favorable review from Michelle Kim of Pitchfork. Kim gave the album a 6.8, she noted that on Girls, Tate "flexes all her modes, too, delivering silky R&B vocals, sassy bubblegum-popping bars, and pop-punky chants."

Track listing
All tracks written and produced by Tate Farris.

Release history

References

2019 debut albums
Baby Tate (rapper) albums
Self-released albums